Tomorrow's Another Day may refer to:

 Tomorrow's Another Day (2000 film), French film
 Tomorrow's Another Day (2011 film), documentary about Swedish film director Roy Andersson
 "Tomorrow's Another Day" (song), 1935 song composed by Glenn Miller for the Dorsey Brothers Orchestra